Kieran James Phillips (born 18 February 2000) is an English professional footballer who plays as a forward for EFL Championship side Huddersfield Town.

Career
Born in Huddersfield, Phillips started his football career playing for his local club, Huddersfield Town, before moving to Everton's academy at under-13 level. In 2016, he suffered a double knee fracture, which ruled him out for two and a half years.

Phillips returned to Huddersfield Town in January 2020, originally on a loan deal until the end of the 2019–20 season. The deal was made permanent on 13 July 2020, with Phillips signing until the summer of 2021, with the option of a further year's extension. On 10 September, Phillips signed a new contract with the club, running end of the 2021–22 season – again with the option of an additional year.

Phillips made his professional début for Huddersfield on 2 January 2021, when he came on as a substitute in their 2–1 Championship defeat to Reading, replacing Rarmani Edmonds-Green. He made his first senior start for the club in a 3–2 FA Cup Third Round defeat at home to Plymouth Argyle.

On 12 July 2021, Phillips joined League Two side Walsall on a season-long loan deal. He signed a new contract with Huddersfield, running until 2025, on 20 January 2022. Phillips was recalled by Huddersfield on 28 January, after scoring five goals in thirty-three appearances across all competitions.

Three days later, Phillips joined League Two club Exeter City on loan, until the end of the 2021–22 season. The move was due to him playing as a winger at Walsall, but Huddersfield seeing his long-term future as a striker – which Exeter were able to cater for.

At the start of the 2022–23 season, Phillips joined Morecambe on loan for the season, but his loan was curtailed on 16 January 2023, owing to a long-term injury.

Career statistics

References

2000 births
Living people
Huddersfield Town A.F.C. players
Association football forwards
English footballers
English Football League players
Walsall F.C. players
Exeter City F.C. players
Morecambe F.C. players
Footballers from Huddersfield